Calvin Butler Hulbert (October 18, 1827 – February 12, 1917) was president of Middlebury College from 1875 until 1880. As president, Hulbert suspended the entire student body of the college following a controversy over hazing.  Following this controversy, Hulbert resigned as President under pressure from trustees and returned to his ministry in New Haven, Vt.

Family 
Calvin's son Homer Hulbert was an educator in Korea and activist for Korean independence.

References 

1827 births
1917 deaths
Presidents of Middlebury College